École Salish Secondary School is a public high school in Surrey, British Columbia and it is part of School District 36 Surrey. It is rivals With the Lord Tweedsmuir Panthers which is based at Lord Tweedsmuir Secondary School

History
Construction of École Salish Secondary began in late 2016 and was completed in 2018. École Salish Secondary opened in September 2018 and was named after the local Salish peoples who are indigenous to the area. Its first students were mostly former students from Lord Tweedsmuir Secondary and Clayton Heights Secondary. Its first principal was Sheila Hammond, the former principal of Johnston Heights Secondary School. As of June 2019, it was the Surrey School District's least-crowded secondary school. It currently has around 2000 students.

Programs 
École Salish Secondary is one of the four secondary schools in the Surrey school district to offer French immersion.

Athletic Achievements 
 2022 AA Tier II Senior Girls Rugby Provincial Champions

References

High schools in Surrey, British Columbia
Educational institutions established in 2018
Buildings and structures in Surrey, British Columbia
2018 establishments in British Columbia